San Dalmazio is a Roman Catholic church in Volterra, region of Tuscany, Italy. The facade is built in local stone in a Renaissance-style, but the interior has a late Baroque decoration.

History

The church was part of a Benedictine order monastery, with a facade attributed to Bartolomeo Ammannati. The Benedictines located here in the early 12th century, and were suppressed in 1786 by Peter Leopold I, Grand-Duke of Tuscany. The interior was refurbished with elegant stucco, in the early 18th century. Among the works inside are a Deposition (1551) by Giovanni Paolo Rossetti, and a fresco in the cupola depicting the Apotheosis of St Dalmatius, Bishop of Pedona (1709) by Ranieri del Pace. Other works documented in an inventory in the early 19th century, were paintings by Giovanni Sagrestani, Jacopo Vignali, and Giovanni Balducci.

Sources

Roman Catholic churches in Volterra
Renaissance architecture in Tuscany
Religious buildings and structures completed in 1511
16th-century Roman Catholic church buildings in Italy
18th-century Roman Catholic church buildings in Italy